Michael Reddy (died 30 July 1919) was an Irish nationalist politician from County Offaly.

He was a farmer from Shannonbridge, and a local councillor.

A member of the Irish Parliamentary Party, he was elected at the 1900 general election as the Member of Parliament (MP) for Birr, and held the seat until the constituency was abolished at the 1918 general election.

References

External links 
 

Year of birth missing
1919 deaths
Irish Parliamentary Party MPs
Members of the Parliament of the United Kingdom for King's County constituencies (1801–1922)
UK MPs 1900–1906
UK MPs 1906–1910
UK MPs 1910
UK MPs 1910–1918
Local councillors in County Offaly